Masturi is one of the 90 Legislative Assembly constituencies of Chhattisgarh state in India. It is in Bilaspur district and is reserved for candidates belonging to the Scheduled Castes. It is also part of Bilaspur Lok Sabha constituency.

Previously, Masturi was part of Madhya Pradesh Legislative Assembly until the state of Chhattisgarh was created in 2000.

Members of Legislative Assembly
 1957: Ganeshram
 2003: Krishnamurti Bandhi, Bharatiya Janata Party 
 2008: Krishnamurti Bandhi, Bharatiya Janata Party 
 2013: Dilip Lahariya, Indian National Congress

Election results

2018

See also
 Bilaspur district, Chhattisgarh
 List of constituencies of Chhattisgarh Legislative Assembly

References

Assembly constituencies of Chhattisgarh
Bilaspur district, Chhattisgarh